A baffle is a surgically created tunnel or wall within the heart or major blood vessels used to redirect the flow of blood.  They are used in some types of heart abnormalities that a child is born with known as congenital heart defects.  Baffles are usually constructed, at least in part, from a person's own heart tissue, while other methods of redirecting blood using artificial material are known by the more generic term 'conduits'.  Baffle does not refer to surgical techniques that redirect blood outside the heart or blood vessels such as coronary artery bypass grafting.

Baffles can be made between different structures depending on the heart condition that needs to be treated.  The Mustard and Senning 'atrial switch' procedures use a baffle within the atria, redirecting blood from the superior and inferior vena cava to the left ventricle and blood from the pulmonary veins to the right ventricle, to treat transposition of the great arteries.  The lateral tunnel form of the Fontan procedure uses a baffle to redirect blood from the inferior vena cava to the pulmonary arteries.

References

Congenital heart defects